Cypro-Minoan is a Unicode block containing characters used on the island of Cyprus during the late Bronze Age (c. 1550–1050 BC).

History
The following Unicode-related documents record the purpose and process of defining specific characters in the Cypro-Minoan block:

References 

Unicode blocks